Sutton & Epsom Rugby Football Club is a rugby union club based in Rugby Lane, Cheam, London, having been formed in 1881. The club first played against Saracens in the 1883–84 season as one of their very early opponents and in 1901 beat Stade Francais on their home ground. They currently play in  London & South East Premier.

Overview
The club has a total of twenty-five teams with 1,200 current and former playing members, plus 1,800 social members who are usually members of their families. There are currently seven adult teams for men headed by a first XV and the club was one of the first to form an adult ladies rugby squad. The club has both mini and junior rugby sections and run 60 children strong development groups for those at under 5 and under 6. The Rugby Football Union national guidelines for children of these ages were based upon this approach and that of Ealing RFC. The club run similar sized age groups for both boys and girls at each of the under-7 to under-12 age groups, at each of which they play to a nationally recognised and tailored game format.

The club has nine senior sides:

1. First XV

2. Swallows

3. Swifts

4. Extra Bs

5. Development

6. Vets

7. Under 21's

8. Colts

9. Ladies

The Ladies
Sutton and Epsom RFC Ladies team has been available for all women for ten years now, accessible for anyone over the age of 18 who wish to pursue the game of rugby. The Sutton And Epsom squad have recently been promoted into the RFUW NC South East South 2 division. Through continuous support and commitment as well as new players, Sutton and Epsom Ladies have managed to make a season of being recently promoted to a close 3rd position in the 2009–10 season. Not only are the ladies succeeding on the rugby field but also socially; with charity events and individual donations Sutton and Epsom Ladies managed to raise £1396.10 for Breast Cancer appeal. With intent this season to improve on last years donations, starting off with the 5K run on 5 September 2010 at Hyde Park and plans to complete the Palace to Palace ride on 26 September 2010.

Honours
Surrey Cup winners (10): 1897, 1898, 1909, 1984, 1990, 1991, 1997, 2000, 2008, 2009
London 1 South champions (2): 2006–07, 2015–16
London 2 (south-east v south-west) promotion play-off winners: 2012–13
London & South East Premier champions: 2018–19

References

External links
 Official website

English rugby union teams
Rugby clubs established in 1881
Rugby union clubs in London
Rugby union clubs in Surrey
Sport in the London Borough of Sutton
1881 establishments in England